Mojin may refer to:

Mojin-dong, a dong, neighbourhood of Gwangjin-gu in Seoul, South Korea
Mojin: The Lost Legend, 2015 Chinese film
Mojin: The Worm Valley, 2018 Chinese film